World's Greatest Lover may refer to:

 The World's Greatest Lover, 1977 American comedy film
 "World's Greatest Lover" (Cheap Trick song), 1980
 "World's Greatest Lover" (The Bellamy Brothers song), 1984